Bishop Giuse Nguyễn Tấn Tước is a Vietnamese prelate. He is the current Bishop of Phú Cường and the Head of the Episcopal Committee on Social Communications.

Biography
Bishop Giuse Nguyễn Tấn Tước was born on September 22, 1958 in Bình Dương, Vietnam. From 1971 to 1978, he studied philosophy and theology at local seminaries. On April 4, 1991, he was ordained a priest by Bishop Louis Hà Kim Danh, the second bishop of Phú Cường. In 1999, he was sent to France to continue his studies at the Institut Catholique de Paris until 2006. After returning to Vietnam, he worked at the Phú Cường diocese's Pastoral Center.

Pope Benedict XVI appointed him as Coadjutor Bishop of Phú Cường on March 14, 2011. Bishop Giuse Nguyễn Tấn Tước was consecrated a bishop by Bishop Phêrô Trần Đình Tứ, the third bishop of Phú Cường, on April 29 that year.

He succeeded Bishop Phêrô Trần Đình Tứ, who was retiring, to be the fourth bishop of Phú Cường on June 30, 2012.

References

External links 
Catholic Hierarchy: Bishop Giuse Nguyễn Tấn Tước

Notes

1958 births
Living people
21st-century Roman Catholic bishops in Vietnam
People from Bình Dương Province